J. J. Keller Field at Titan Stadium is a multi-purpose stadium at the University of Wisconsin–Oshkosh in Oshkosh, Wisconsin. Other sports facilities at the university are Kolf Sports Center, Tiedemann Field, and Albee Hall. It was named after John J. Keller, founder of J. J. Keller & Associates, Inc., a safety and compliance solutions company located in Neenah, Wisconsin, with funds from the John J. & Ethel D. Keller fund at the Community Foundation of the Fox Valley Region.

History
The stadium was built in 1970. The stadium  has a capacity of 9,800 people. It was renovated in 2004 for nearly $10 Million to update the facility, include the capability to play soccer, as well as a turf field.

The stadium has one large grandstand on the West side of the field. There is a running track around the stadium.  The football playing field is not centered, rather it is closer to the grandstand, improving visibility from there.

There is, in addition, a smaller running track/soccer field located next to Titan Stadium.

In 2007 and 2008, the DIII National Track and Field Championships were hosted at Titan Stadium.

The stadium is also used for home games/meets for the Oshkosh high schools; Oshkosh West Wildcats, Oshkosh North Spartans, and Oshkosh Lourdes Knights.

References

External links
Photos at UWOsh.edu
Aerial View of Titan Stadium

College football venues
American football venues in Wisconsin
University of Wisconsin–Oshkosh
Multi-purpose stadiums in the United States
Sports venues completed in 1970
1970 establishments in Wisconsin
High school football venues in the United States